Seán Walsh (born 6 April 1957) is an Irish former Gaelic footballer who played for the Kerins O'Rahilly's club and at senior level for the Kerry county team between 1976 and 1987, during which he won seven All-Ireland SFC titles.

His sons Tommy and Barry John also played football for Kerry.

References

1957 births
Living people
All Stars Awards winners (football)
Irish auctioneers
Kerins O'Rahilly's Gaelic footballers
Kerry inter-county Gaelic footballers
Munster inter-provincial Gaelic footballers
People from Tralee
Seán
Winners of seven All-Ireland medals (Gaelic football)